Bihar competed in the Vijay Hazare Trophy  until 2003-04, after which it was succeeded by the Jharkhand cricket team.
Again after a gap of 15 years Bihar is playing in Vijay Hazare Trophy in 2018-19.

History
In April 2018, the Board of Control for Cricket in India (BCCI) reinstated Bihar, ahead of the 2018–19 Ranji Trophy tournament. On 19 September 2018, they won their opening fixture of the 2018–19 Vijay Hazare Trophy, beating Nagaland by 8 wickets.

On 8 October 2018, Bihar defeated Mizoram by 9 wickets to enter the Quarter-finals of 2018-19 Vijay Hazare Trophy. Bihar won the Plate Group and progressed to the knock-out phase of the tournament. However, they were beaten by nine wickets by Mumbai in their quarter-final match to be knocked out of the tournament.

Record

White: Group/Round-Robin Stage

References 

Bihar cricketers
International cricket competitions in India